Tominaga (written:  or ) is a Japanese surname. Notable people with the surname include:

, Japanese fashion model and actress
Geovanna Tominaga (born 1980), Brazilian actress and television host
, Japanese footballer
, Japanese basketball player
, Japanese actor
, Japanese volleyball player
, Japanese film director
, Japanese voice actress and television personality
, Japanese sport wrestler
, Japanese war criminal and peace activist
, Japanese philosopher
, Japanese footballer

See also
Tominaga Dam, a dam in Aichi Prefecture, Japan

Japanese-language surnames